Brookhaven State Park is a  state park in Wading River and Ridge, New York, approximately  east of New York City. Established in 1971, the park land was formerly the property of Brookhaven National Laboratory. Protecting a large amount of the Long Island Pine Barrens, the park also contains scattered wetlands.

Brookhaven State Park is located along the east side William Floyd Parkway, between NY 25 and NY 25A. The park contains  of multi-use trails.

See also
List of New York state parks

References

External links
New York State Parks: Brookhaven State Park
Brookhaven State Park (New York, New Jersey, Connecticut Botany Online)
Federal Lands to Parks in New York State (National Park Service)
Brookhaven State Park Trails (Wandering Around the Block)

State parks of New York (state)
Brookhaven, New York
Parks in Suffolk County, New York
1971 establishments in New York (state)
Protected areas established in 1971